The Kane Gang were an English pop trio formed in Seaham in 1982. The group comprised Martin Brammer, Paul Woods and Dave Brewis. They scored several UK and US hits in the 1980s. Named alluding to the movie Citizen Kane, the trio recorded for the record label Kitchenware, which was also home to Prefab Sprout.

History
Vocalists Martin Brammer (born 13 May 1957, Seaham, County Durham) and Paul Woods, with multi-instrumentalist Dave Brewis, formed the trio in 1982, after meeting while in small local bands, and signed to a small record label, which led to a deal with London Records in 1984. 

Their debut album, The Bad and Lowdown World of the Kane Gang (released in the US as Lowdown), was released the following year. It spawned two UK hit singles: "Closest Thing to Heaven" (No. 12) and a cover of the Staples Singers' "Respect Yourself" (No. 21). The latter was also a hit in Australia, reaching No. 19. The album was produced by Pete Wingfield, and featured P. P. Arnold and Sam Brown as backing vocalists.

The band's next album, Miracle, was released in 1987 and spawned two US hit singles: "Motortown" (No. 36 US / No. 45 UK) and another cover – this time of Dennis Edwards' "Don't Look Any Further" (No. 64 US / No. 52 UK). The latter hit No. 1 on the US Dance Charts.

Woods left the band in 1991 to attempt a solo career. Woods and Brewis also worked on an album which was never released.

Other works
The Kane Gang performed the music for the "Ooh Gary Davies... On Your Radio" jingle for BBC Radio 1. As was the fashion around that time, bands would adapt songs to provide the radio station with a jingle, and embed the hook of the track in the public's consciousness. The Gary Davies jingle was based on their track "Smalltown Creed" (from the LP The Bad and Lowdown World of the Kane Gang). The same track was used as the basis for the theme tune of long-running Children's BBC television programme Byker Grove, which launched the careers of Ant & Dec (as PJ & Duncan) and Donna Air.

Discography

Studio albums

Compilation albums

Singles

See also
 List of Billboard number-one dance club songs
 List of artists who reached number one on the U.S. Dance Club Songs chart
 List of number-one dance singles of 1988 (U.S.)
 List of 1980s one-hit wonders in the United States
 List of performers on Top of the Pops
 Bands and musicians from Yorkshire and North East England
 Now That's What I Call Music 4 (UK series)

Citations

External links
 

1982 establishments in England
1991 disestablishments in England
English pop music groups
Musical groups established in 1982
Musical groups disestablished in 1991
Musical groups from North East England
Sophisti-pop musical groups
British musical trios